The women's lightweight double sculls competition at the 1996 Summer Olympics in Atlanta, Georgia took place at Lake Lanier.

Results

Heats
The winner of each heat advanced to the semifinals, remainder go to the repechage.

Heat 1

Heat 2

Heat 3

Repechage
The first three places advanced to the semifinals, remainder go to the Final C.

Repechage 1

Repechage 2

Repechage 3

Semifinals
The first three places advanced to the Final A, remainder go to the Final B.

Semifinal 1

Semifinal 2

Finals

Final C

Final B

Final A

References

Rowing at the 1996 Summer Olympics
Women's rowing at the 1996 Summer Olympics